The Club of Queer Trades is a collection of stories by G. K. Chesterton first published in 1905.

Each story in the collection is centered on a person who is making his living by some novel and extraordinary means (a "queer trade", using the word "queer" in the sense of "strange"). To gain admittance one must have invented a unique means of earning a living and the subsequent trade being the main source of income.

Characters
 The Narrator, Charlie "Cherub" Swinburne
 Basil Grant
 Rupert Grant

Stories
The framing narrative by "Cherub" Swinburne describes his quest for The Club of Queer Trades with his friend Basil Grant, a retired judge, and Rupert Grant, a private detective who is Basil's younger brother.  Each of the stories describes their encounter with one of the trades.

The Tremendous Adventures of Major Brown

First appeared in Harper’s Weekly [v47, December 19, 1903]

While investigating a case of assault brought by Major Brown, Rupert Grant, the private detective, and his brother Basil stumble upon the Adventure and Romance Agency, Limited, an agency that creates adventures for its clients. The story is notable for prefiguring the concept of the alternate reality game.

The Painful Fall of a Great Reputation

Basil Grant investigates Wimpole, the great raconteur.

The Awful Reason of the Vicar's Visit

First appeared in  Harper’s Weekly  [v48, May 28 & June 4, 1904]

"Cherub" Swinburne is asked to investigate the mysterious assault on the Vicar of Chuntsey (in Essex).

The Singular Speculation of the House-Agent

First appeared in  Harper’s Weekly  [v48,  June 11 and 18, 1904]

Basil Grant investigates the mystery of Lieutenant Keith, whose house, "The Elms", Buxton Common, cannot be found.

The Noticeable Conduct of Professor Chadd

First appeared in Harper’s Weekly [v48, June 25, 1904]

Basil Grant finds out why Professor Chadd insists on dancing.

The Eccentric Seclusion of the Old Lady

First appeared in Harper’s Weekly [v48, July 9 & 16, 1904]

Rupert Grant rescues a lady from her kidnappers but cannot understand why she refuses to be rescued.  The answer leads to the final unveiling of the mystery of the Club of Queer Trades.

External links

 
 
The Club of Queer Trades, 1905 First Edition in volume at Open Library
 
 Radio adaption from BBC Radio 4 Extra starring David Warner, Martin Freeman, Geoffrey Whitehead and Vicki Pepperdine.

1905 short story collections
Frame stories
Short stories by G. K. Chesterton
Mystery short story collections
Books by G. K. Chesterton
Harper & Brothers books